Iwate Prefecture held a gubernatorial election on April 13, 2003. Incumbent governor Hiroya Masuda was re-elected.

Sources 
 National Election Administration Committee

2003 elections in Japan
Iwate gubernational elections
April 2003 events in Japan